Berkan Algan (born 29 March 1977) is a German former professional footballer who played as a midfielder.

References

External links
 

Living people
1977 births
German footballers
Association football midfielders
1. FC Köln players
Bursaspor footballers
FC St. Pauli players
Hamburger SV players
FC Haka players
SC Concordia von 1907 players
FC Schönberg 95 players
Altonaer FC von 1893 players
FC St. Pauli II players
German football managers
Altonaer FC von 1893 managers
Footballers from Hamburg